Stefan Fröhlich (born 1958 in Bonn, Germany) is a German political scientist and professor for International Relations at the Friedrich-Alexander-University Erlangen-Nuremberg. The emphasis in his work is on German foreign policy, transatlantic relations and US foreign policy, European foreign and security policy, and International Political Economy.

Education and career
From 1979 till 1985 Fröhlich studied political science, English studies, Hispanism and economics in Bonn, Paris, Philadelphia and Washington D.C. Afterwards he worked as research associate for the German Bundestag till 1989 and as assistant lecturer in the Institute for Political Science at the University of Bonn (1989–1994).
After he completed his habilitation thesis in political science at Bonn University (1996) Fröhlich worked as a substitute professor at the University Trier. In 1997 he was an associate at the Deutschen Gesellschaft für Auswärtige Politik (German Society for Foreign Politics) and an associate professor at Bonn University. Subsequently Fröhlich was program director of the post-graduate course of lectures "European Studies" at the Zentrum für Europäische Integrationsforschung (ZEI, Centre for European integration research) at the University of Bonn till 2002.

Since 1999 he has been visiting professor in: Antwerp, Bruges, Budapest, Bonn (ZEI), Milan, Birmingham, London, Vienna, Tübingen, Washington and Moscow. Fröhlich has also been abroad for longer research periods at the Center for Transatlantic Relations at Johns Hopkins University in Washington D.C. (2002/03) and at the Woodrow Wilson Center, Washington D.C. (2007). Currently Fröhlich is visiting professor at the Collège d'Europe in Bruges & Natolin, at the Zentrum für Europäische Integrationsforschung (ZEI) in Bonn and at the universities in Innsbruck and Zurich.

He is a frequent contributor to national and international print media as well as guest and analyst in German TV and broadcasting.

Since 2003 Fröhlich is Full Professor for international relations at the University Erlangen-Nuremberg.

Memberships
Directorate of the admission committee for German students at Bruges (European Movement International)
Senior Fellow at Center for European Integration Studies, Bonn 
Deutsche Gesellschaft für Politikwissenschaft
Deutsche Gesellschaft für auswärtige Politik (DGAP) (German Council on Foreign Relations)
Arbeitskreis Europäische Integration
Deutsche Atlantische Gesellschaft (board of directors)
Advisory Board, the Harris German/Dartmouth Distinguished Visiting Professorship at Dartmouth College
Advisory Board of Kölner Forums für Internationale Beziehungen und Sicherheitspolitik (KFIBS, Cologne Panel for International Relations and security policy)

Publications (monographs)
The New Geopolitics of Transatlantic Relations. Coordinated Responses to Common Dangers. Washington DC: Johns Hopkins University Press, 2012
Zehn Jahre Deutschland in Afghanistan (Hrsg. mit Klaus Brummer). In: Zeitschrift für Außen- und Sicherheitspolitik, Sonderheft 3/2011
Die EU als globaler Akteur. Lehrbuch, VS-Verlag, 2008
Strategic Implications of Euro-Atlantic Enlargement (Hrsg. mit Esther Brimmer), Washington 2005
The Difficulties of EU Governance: What way forward for the EU Institutions? Frankfurt a. M.: Peter Lang-Verlag, 2004
Auf den Kanzler kommt es an. Außen- und Europapolitik in der Ära Kohl in den achtziger Jahren, Paderborn: Schöningh-Verlag, 2001
Amerikanische Geopolitik. Von den Anfängen bis zum Ende des Zweiten Weltkrieges, Landsberg: Olzog Verlag, 1998
Zwischen selektiver Verteidigung und globaler Eindämmung. Geostrategisches Denken in den USA während der Jahrzehnte des Kalten Krieges, Baden-Baden: Nomos 1998
Die USA und die neue Weltordnung. Amerikanische Außenpolitik nach dem Ende des Kalten Krieges, Bonn/Berlin: Bouvier Verlag, 1992
Nuclear Freeze Campaign. Die Kampagne für das Einfrieren der Nuklearwaffen unter der Reagan-Administration, Opladen: Leske und Budrich, 1990

Publications (case studies)
Future Perspectives for Transatlantic Relations. American Institute for Contemporary German Studies. Juni 2012
Major tasks and the state of the art. The work of the EU Convention, Washington, SAIS 2004
Globalization and the future of the transatlantic relations, Policy Paper, KAS, Berlin, März 2003
Die GASP der EU: Entwicklungen und Perspektiven, ZEI/Discussion Paper, Dezember 2002
Der Ausbau der Europäischen Verteidigungsidentität zwischen WEU und NATO. Zentrum für Europäische Integrationsforschung (ZEI), Discussion Paper, Bonn, Juli 1998
Möglichkeiten amerikanisch-europäischer Kooperation: Der Aktionsplan zur Transatlantischen Agenda, Sankt Augustin 1997
Fragen einer institutionellen Gestaltung der internationalen Ordnung. Zur aktuellen Theoriedebatte, Studie für den Bereich Forschung und Beratung der Konrad-Adenauer-Stiftung (KAS), Sankt Augustin 1996

References

External links
Professor Dr. Stefan Fröhlich at Universität Erlangen-Nürnberg, on April, 30. 2013.

1958 births
German political scientists
Living people